Dirk Käsebier (born September 16, 1966) is a German boxer. He competed for the SC Dynamo Berlin.

References 

1966 births
Living people
Lightweight boxers
German male boxers